North Hampton is the name of several places in the United States, including:

North Hampton, St. Louis, Missouri, a neighborhood
North Hampton, New Hampshire, a town
North Hampton, Ohio, a village

See also
Northampton (disambiguation)